Nora Campos (born June 15, 1965) is an American politician from California. Campos formerly served as a California State Assemblymember and was the President pro tempore during her tenure. In 2020, she was unsuccessful in her campaign for the California's 15th State Senate district. She served on the San Jose City Council representing District 5 (2001-2010). She was unsuccessful in her campaign for the same seat in 2022.  Prior to taking elected office she worked for a San Jose City Councilmember.

Early life and education
Nora Campos was raised in the Cassell neighborhood in East San Jose. She marched with Cesar E. Chavez and cites her early experience with the Farm Worker Movement as an influence on her decision to enter public service as an adult.

Campos graduated from William C. Overfelt High School in 1983 and earned a Bachelor of Arts degree from San Francisco State University.

San Jose City Council
Campos was elected to represent District 5, representing East San Jose on the San Jose City Council in a special election in March 2001 and served for ten years, winning re-election twice. Campos was elected following the election of Ron Gonzales, the first Latino mayor of San Jose. As a Councilmember, Campos focused on improving opportunities for youth as a counter to gang activities and looked to improve the wages of the working class in San Jose through enforcement of labor laws. She formerly served on the California Commission on the Status of Women and Girls and was a member of the Latino Caucus of the League of California Cities.

California State Assembly

In June 2009, Campos announced her candidacy for the 23rd California State Assembly District. She was elected on November 10, 2010, with 75% of the vote, succeeding term-limited Democrat Joe Coto. In August 2012, she was appointed speaker pro tempore in the Assembly.

As an assemblywoman, Campos prioritized policies surrounding civil rights. She sponsored a bill that resolved for the federal government to "immediately halt cases it is pursuing against unrepresented immigrant children until lawyers are made available to represent them." In a disappointing turn during the 2015 session, Democratic Governor Brown vetoed Campos' AB 1017, a bill that would have barred employers from using previous salary information to justify paying women less than their male co-workers. The bill was one of two vetoed by Governor Brown that day that targeted gender equity, the other was by fellow Assemblywoman Lorena Gonzalez and addressed gender parity in workers' compensation. In 2016, Campos authored AB 2393 which improved parental leave for all California K-14 employees. It was enrolled into law when Governor Brown signed.

While a State Assemblymember, Campos was chair of the Arts, Entertainment, Sports, Tourism, and Internet Media Committee, and of the Status of Girls and Women of Color Committee.  Her committee assignments included Budget Committee, the Business and Professions Committee, the Campus Climate Committee, the Governmental Organization Committee, the Health Committee, the Legislative Budget Committee, the Women in the Workplace Committee, the Environmental Safety and Toxic Materials Committee, the Local Government Committee, and the Water, Parks and Wildlife Committee. {{cn}}

California State Senate Candidacy
In 2016, termed out as an Assemblymember and after advancing in the primary with the endorsement of then-presidential candidate Hillary Clinton, Campos failed to unseat Jim Beall in the election for the 15th State Senate District by a wide margin.

In 2020, Jim Beall termed out of California's 15th State Senate district. Campos was one of seven candidates competing for the open seat; the others were fellow Democrats: former San Jose city council member and termed-out Santa Clara County Supervisor Dave Cortese and UC Berkeley Law School adjunct lecturer Ann Ravel along with Republicans Robert Howell and U.S. Army staff sergeant Ken Del Valle and independents Tim Gildersleeve and termed-out San Jose City Councilman Johnny Khamis. During the campaign, Campos received criticism for receiving aid from oil company including Chevron and a political organizations with ties to similar energy companies that also produce oil and gas.

Campos was defeated in the March 3rd jungle primary by Cortese and Ravel, finishing in third place. Had Campos been successful, she would have been the first Latina/o to hold the 15th State Senate seat (including prior to rezoning the 13th Senate District).

Election results

2010 California State Assembly

2012 California State Assembly

2014 California State Assembly

2016 California State Senate

2020 California State Senate

2022 San Jose City Council District 5

References

External links
 Campaign website
 Ballotpedia
 Legislative record

|-

1966 births
Living people
Democratic Party members of the California State Assembly
San Francisco State University alumni
San Jose City Council members
Women state legislators in California
American politicians of Mexican descent
Hispanic and Latino American state legislators in California
Hispanic and Latino American women in politics
Women city councillors in California
Politicians from San Jose, California
21st-century American politicians
21st-century American women politicians